Marilyn Joy Wilson (born 14 July 1943), known after her marriage as Marilyn Young, is an Australian former backstroke swimmer of the 1960s, who won a silver medal in the women's 4×100-metre medley relay at the 1960 Summer Olympics in Rome.  She combined with her Australian teammates Dawn Fraser, Jan Andrew and Rosemary Lassig to finish second in the medley relay, trailing the Americans relay team by five seconds.  In her only individual event, the women's 100-metre backstroke, Wilson competed in the preliminary heats, but did not advance.

See also
 List of Olympic medalists in swimming (women)

References
 

1943 births
Living people
Swimmers at the 1960 Summer Olympics
Olympic swimmers of Australia
Australian female backstroke swimmers
Medalists at the 1960 Summer Olympics
Olympic silver medalists for Australia
Olympic silver medalists in swimming
20th-century Australian women